Water polo events were contested at the 2001 Summer Universiade in Beijing, China.

External links
 Universiade water polo medalists on HickokSports

2001 Summer Universiade
Universiade
2001
2001